The NeverEnding Story is a 1984 fantasy film co-written and directed by Wolfgang Petersen (in his first English-language film), and based on the 1979 novel The Neverending Story by Michael Ende. It was produced by Bernd Eichinger and Dieter Giessler, and stars Noah Hathaway, Barret Oliver, Tami Stronach, Patricia Hayes, Sydney Bromley, Gerald McRaney and Moses Gunn, with Alan Oppenheimer providing the voices of Falkor and Gmork (as well as other characters). It follows a boy who finds a magical book that tells of a young warrior who is given the task of stopping the Nothing, a dark force, from engulfing the wonderland world of Fantasia.

At the time of its release, it was the most expensive film produced outside the United States or the Soviet Union. It was the first in The NeverEnding Story film series. It adapts only the first half of the book, and consequently does not convey the message of the title as it was portrayed in the novel. The second half of the book was subsequently used as a rough basis for the second film, The NeverEnding Story II: The Next Chapter (1990). The third film, The NeverEnding Story III: Escape from Fantasia (1994), has an original plot not based on the book.

Plot

Ten-year-old Bastian Bux is a shy and outcast bibliophile and lives with his widowed father. One day on his way to school, Bastian is chased by bullies but escapes by hiding in a bookstore, annoying the bookseller, Mr. Coreander. Bastian's interest in books leads him to ask about the one Coreander is reading, but the bookseller advises against reading it, saying that it is not a "safe" story like regular books. With his curiosity piqued, Bastian secretly takes the book, titled The Neverending Story, leaving a note promising to return it, and hides in the school's attic to read.

The book describes the fantasy world of Fantasia slowly being devoured by a malevolent force called "The Nothing". The Childlike Empress, who rules Fantasia, has fallen ill, and the young warrior Atreyu is tasked to discover a cure, believing that once the Empress is well, the Nothing will no longer be a threat. Atreyu is given a medallion called the Auryn that can guide and protect him in the quest. As Atreyu sets out, the Nothing summons a vicious and highly intelligent wolf-like creature named Gmork and sends him to kill Atreyu.

Atreyu's quest directs him to the giant, turtle-like adviser Morla the Ancient One in the Swamps of Sadness. Though the Auryn protects Atreyu, his beloved horse Artax is lost to the swamp, and he continues alone. Morla, who is allergic to youth, can't help Atreyu, but reluctantly directs him to the Southern Oracle, ten thousand miles distant. Gmork closes in as Atreyu succumbs to exhaustion trying to escape the Swamps, but is narrowly saved by the luck dragon Falkor. Falkor takes him to the home of two gnomes who live near the gates to the Southern Oracle. Atreyu crosses the first gate, but is perplexed when the second gate—a mirror that shows the viewer's true self—reveals a boy which Bastian recognizes as himself. Atreyu eventually meets the Southern Oracle, who tells him that the only way to save the Empress is to find a human child who lives beyond the boundaries of Fantasia to give her a new name. Atreyu and Falkor flee, as the Nothing consumes the Southern Oracle.

In flight, Atreyu is knocked from Falkor's back into the Sea of Possibilities, losing the Auryn in the process. He wakes on the shore of some abandoned ruins, where he finds several murals depicting his adventure, including one of Gmork. Gmork then reveals himself and explains that Fantasia represents humanity's imagination and is thus without boundaries, while the Nothing is a manifestation of the loss of hopes and dreams. Atreyu battles and kills Gmork, as the Nothing begins to consume the ruins.

Falkor manages to retrieve the Auryn and rescue Atreyu. The two find themselves in a void with only small fragments of Fantasia remaining, fearing that they have failed, until they spot the Empress' Ivory Tower among the fragments. Inside, Atreyu apologizes for failing the Empress, but she assures him that he has succeeded in bringing to her a human child who has been following his quest Bastian. She further explains that, just as Bastian is following Atreyu's story, "others" are following Bastian's, making this part of the Neverending Story. As the Nothing begins to consume the Tower, the Empress explains that Bastian must call out her new name to save Fantasia. Disbelieving he has been incorporated with the story, he denies these events actually happened. He gives in after she pleads directly to him to call out her new name, running to the window of the attic to call out "Moon Child".

Bastian awakens with the Empress, who presents him with a grain of sand the sole remnant of Fantasia. The Empress tells Bastian that he has the power to bring Fantasia back with his imagination. Bastian re-creates Fantasia and flies on Falkor's back to see the land and its inhabitants restored, including Atreyu and Artax. When Falkor asks what his next wish will be, Bastian brings Falkor to the real world to chase down the school bullies. The film narrates that Bastian had many more wishes and adventures, "But that's another story".

Cast 

 Barret Oliver as Bastian Balthazar Bux
 Noah Hathaway as Atreyu
 Tami Stronach as The Childlike Empress, to whom Bastian gives the new name "Moon Child".
 Patricia Hayes as Urgl, Engywook's wife and a healer.
 Sydney Bromley as Engywook, Urgl's husband and a scientist.
 Gerald McRaney as Barney Bux, Bastian's widowed, workaholic father.
 Moses Gunn as Cairon, a servant of the Empress.
 Alan Oppenheimer as the voices of Falkor, Gmork, Rockbiter, and the Narrator (the latter three are uncredited).
 Thomas Hill as Carl Conrad Coreander, a grumpy bookseller.
 Deep Roy as Teeny Weeny, a messenger riding on a racing snail.
 Tilo Prückner as Night Hob, a messenger riding a narcoleptic hang-glider bat.
 Darryl Cooksey, Drum Garrett, and Nicholas Gilbert as Ethan, Todd, and Lucas, three bullies who torment Bastian.
 Robert Easton as the voice of Morla (uncredited)

Production 
Author Michael Ende was initially happy about his book being turned into a film. Ende worked with Wolfgang Petersen as a script advisor and was paid only $50,000 for the rights to his book. Ende claimed that Petersen later rewrote the script without consulting him, and felt that this adaptation's content deviated so far from the spirit of his book that he requested that production either be halted or the film's title be changed. When the producers did neither, he sued them and subsequently lost the case. Ende called the film a "gigantic melodrama of kitsch, commerce, plush and plastic".

Helmut Dietl was originally attached to direct the film, but later dropped out and was replaced with Wolfgang Petersen.

The adaptation only covered the first half of the book. German producer Bernd Eichinger saw his children reading the book, and they urged him to make a film out of it. He was reluctant to adapt the book, but agreed to do so and acquired the rights to the book. The bulk of the film was shot at Stage 1 of the Bavaria Studios in Munich, with the street scenes and the school interior in the real world shot in Vancouver, Canada (the Gastown Vancouver Steam Clock can be seen in the bully chase scene at the end of the film, as the three bullies are chased down Cambie Street past the steam clock at the intersection of Water Street and then on down Blood Alley), and the beach where Atreyu falls, which was filmed at Playa de Mónsul in San Jose, Almería, Spain.

Music 
The film score of The NeverEnding Story was composed by Klaus Doldinger of the German jazz group Passport. The theme song of the English version of the film was composed by Giorgio Moroder, with lyrics by Keith Forsey, and performed by Christopher "Limahl" Hamill, once the lead singer of Kajagoogoo, and Beth Anderson. Released as a single in 1984, it peaked at No. 4 on the UK singles chart, No. 6 on the US Billboard Adult Contemporary chart, and No. 17 on the Billboard Hot 100. The song has been covered by Armonite, The Birthday Massacre, Creamy, Dragonland, Kenji Haga and New Found Glory. More recent covers were done by Norwegian synthpop group Echo Image on their 2001 maxi-single Skulk and by German techno group Scooter on their 2007 album Jumping All Over the World. This Limahl song, along with other "techno-pop" treatments to the soundtrack, is not present in the German version of the film, which features Doldinger's orchestral score exclusively. 

In 1994, Italian house music group Club House released the song "Nowhere Land", featuring Carl, which combines the melody of the tune "Bastian's Happy Flight" with original lyrics.

An official soundtrack album was released featuring Doldinger's score and Moroder's theme tune (Moroder also rescored several scenes for the version released outside Germany). The track listing (Doldinger is responsible for everything from track 6 onwards) is as follows:

In Germany, an album featuring Doldinger's score was released.

Charts

Release 
 6 April 1984 in West Germany
 20 July 1984 in the United States (The NeverEnding Story)
 6 October 1984 in Brazil
 21 November 1984 in France
 6 December 1984 in Spain
 7 December 1984 in Italy
 4 April 1985 in the United Kingdom (The NeverEnding Story)

Box office 
The film performed very well at the box office, grossing US$100 million worldwide against a production budget of DM 60 million (approximately US$25–27 million at the time). Almost 5 million people saw it in Germany, a number rarely achieved by German productions, resulting in a gross of about US$20 million domestically. It grossed a similar amount in the United States—only a modest sum in the American market, which director Wolfgang Petersen ascribed to the film's European sensibilities.

Critical reception 
The film has a Rotten Tomatoes score of 83% based on reviews from 46 critics, with an average rating of 7/10. The site's critical consensus reads: "A magical journey about the power of a young boy's imagination to save a dying fantasy land, The NeverEnding Story remains a much-loved kids adventure". Metacritic gives the film a score of 46 out of 100 based on reviews from 10 critics, indicating "mixed or average reviews".

Roger Ebert of the Chicago Sun-Times gave it 3 out of 4 stars and praised its visual effects, saying that "an entirely new world has been created" because of them, a comment echoed by Variety. Ebert's co-host Gene Siskel said that the film's special effects and art direction were cheap-looking and that Falkor the luckdragon resembled the sort of stuffed toy you'd win at a county fair and throw out when you left. He also referred to Noah Hathaway as a "dullard" and said that the film was "much too long", even after Ebert pointed out that the film was only 90 minutes long. Joshua Tyler of CinemaBlend referred to it as "one of a scant few true fantasy masterpieces".

Vincent Canby panned the film as a "graceless, humorless fantasy for children" in a 1984 review in The New York Times. Canby's criticism charged that parts of the film "sounded like 'The Pre-Teenager's Guide to Existentialism. He further criticized the "tacky" special effects and that the construction of the dragon looked like "an impractical bathmat".

Colin Greenland reviewed The NeverEnding Story for Imagine magazine and stated that "perhaps the heroic quest of young Atreyu to save the land of Fantasia from the all-consuming Nothing might have been more convincing if it hadn't been so clumsily edited".

Accolades 
 Wins
 1984 – Bambi Award for National film
 1984 – Goldene Leinwand (Golden Screen Award)
 1985 – Saturn Award for Best Performance by a Younger Actor (Noah Hathaway)
 1985 – Brazilian Film Award for Best Production
 1985 – Film Award in Gold for Best Production Design
 Nominations
 1985 – Saturn Award for Best Fantasy Film and Saturn Award for Best Music
 1985 – International Fantasy Film Award for Best Film
 1985 – Young Artist Award for Best Family Motion Picture, Best Young Actor, Best Young Supporting Actress

Home media

LaserDisc 
The film was released by Warner Bros. on LaserDisc with a digital stereo soundtrack in 1985.

A widescreen Laserdisc was released on 28 August 1991; no special features were included.

DVD 
The region-1 DVD was first released in 2001 by Warner Bros, containing only the North American release of the film. The only audio option is a 2.0 stereo mix in either English or Spanish. The theatrical trailer is the lone extra feature presented.

There is also a lavish 2003 European version, which is a two-disc special edition with packaging shaped like the book from the film, and containing both the North American and German releases of the film. Various extras, such as a 45-minute documentary, music video, and galleries, are presented on the second disc. There is no English audio for the German version of the film. This edition has gone out of print. The standard single-disc edition is also available for the region-2 market.

A Dutch import has also appeared on the Internet in various places, which not only contains the North American release of the film, but also includes a remastered DTS surround sound track, which is not found in either the German or the region-1 releases.

In 2008, Czech- and Slovak-language DVD versions appeared in the Czech Republic and Slovakia.

Blu-ray 
The first Blu-ray release was a region-free Dutch edition on 24 March 2007.

Warner released a region-A Blu-ray edition of the film in March 2010. The disc includes a lossless DTS-HD Master Audio 5.1 surround track, which marks the first time a 5.1 surround track has been included in a US home-video version of the film. No special features or theatrical trailer are included.

Recent German releases feature the original Klaus Doldinger soundtrack with the original English audio track.

An 30th Anniversary Edition Blu-ray was released in October 2014, which duplicates the DTS surround track of its predecessor. Originally described as a "newly" remastered version of the film, Warner released a statement indicating that "the only remastered version is The NeverEnding Story II", while not elaborating further on this current US release. The 30th Anniversary Edition contains the original theatrical trailer, a commentary track by director Wolfgang Petersen, documentaries and interviews from both 1984 and 2014, and a German-language/English-subtitled feature detailing the digital restoration process of the film.

In popular culture 
 In The Simpsons episode "New Kid on the Block", Lionel Hutz claims to have filed a suit against the film for fraudulent advertising.
 The metalcore band Atreyu took their name from the character of the same name from the film.
 The beatdown hardcore band Nasty has song called "Fantasia" from album "Shokka"  is dedicated to this film.
 Korn's album The Nothing is named directly in reference to the Nothing in the film. Korn frontman Jonathan Davis chose the title as he was still struggling with the death of his estranged wife Deven Davis. Jonathan had said: "I was struggling with the thing that's chasing me – that's always freaking with me. I tried to give it a name and it just fit".
 In 2019, the theme song for the film was incorporated into the final episode of the third season of the science fiction thriller show Stranger Things, which takes place in 1985, furthering its status as a staple of 1980s pop culture. After the episode was aired, the Internet paid streams for the original theme songs went from 300,000 to 1.5 million downloads a month.

Possible remake 
In 2009, Warner Bros., The Kennedy/Marshall Company and Leonardo DiCaprio's Appian Way Productions were in the early stages of creating another adaptation of Ende's novel. They intended to "examine the more nuanced details of the book" rather than remake the original film by Petersen. In 2011, producer Kathleen Kennedy said that problems securing the rights to the story may mean that a second adaptation is "not meant to be".

In September 2022, a bidding war for the film and TV rights of The NeverEnding Story between studios and streamers had emerged.

References

External links 

 
 

1984 films
West German films
1980s English-language films
English-language German films
1980s fantasy adventure films
German children's films
German fantasy adventure films
American children's adventure films
American children's fantasy films
American fantasy adventure films
1980s children's fantasy films
Films about bullying
Films about dragons
Films based on fantasy novels
Films based on German novels
Films directed by Wolfgang Petersen
Puppet films
Films produced by Bernd Eichinger
Films scored by Klaus Doldinger
Films set in Washington (state)
Films shot in Germany
Films shot in Vancouver
High fantasy films
The NeverEnding Story (film series)
Works based on The Neverending Story
Constantin Film films
Warner Bros. films
Films shot in Almería
Metafictional works
1980s American films
1980s German films